The following chronology traces the territorial evolution of the U.S. State of Montana.

Timeline
Historical territorial claims of the United Kingdom in the present State of Montana:
Rupert's Land, 1670–1870
Anglo-American Convention of 1818
Historical territorial claims of France in the present State of Montana:
Louisiane, 1682–1764
Treaty of Fontainebleau of 1762
Historical territorial claims of Spain in the present State of Montana:
Luisiana, 1764–1803
Third Treaty of San Ildefonso of 1800
Historical territorial claims of France in the present State of Montana:
Louisiane, 1803
Vente de la Louisiane of 1803
Historical international territory in the present State of Montana:
Oregon Country, 1818–1846
Provisional Government of Oregon (extralegal), 1843–1849
Oregon Treaty of 1846
Historical political divisions of the United States in the present State of Montana:
Unorganized territory created by the Louisiana Purchase, 1803–1804
District of Louisiana, 1804–1805
Territory of Louisiana, 1805–1812
Territory of Missouri, 1812–1821
Unorganized territory previously the northwestern portion of the Missouri Territory, 1821–1854
Unorganized territory created by the Oregon Treaty, 1846–1848
Territory of Oregon, 1848–1859
Territory of Nebraska, 1854–1867
Territory of Washington, 1853–1889
Territory of Dakota, 1861–1889
Territory of Idaho, 1863–1890
Territory of Montana, 1864-1889
State of Montana since November 8, 1889

See also
History of Montana
Bibliography of Montana history
Historical outline of Montana
List of people in Montana history
Montana in the American Civil War
State of Montana
Territory of Montana
Timeline of Montana history
Timeline of pre-statehood Montana history
Timeline of Billings, Montana

References

External links
State of Montana website
Montana Historical Society
Montana History

Pre-statehood history of Montana
Montana
Montana
History of the Northwestern United States
History of the American West
Montana
Geography of Montana